Ferenc Monostori (b. 26 January 1909 - d. 2008) was a Hungarian ice hockey player. He played for the Hungarian national team at the 1936 Winter Olympics.

References

External links

1909 births
2008 deaths
Hungarian ice hockey goaltenders
Ice hockey players at the 1936 Winter Olympics
Olympic ice hockey players of Hungary
Place of death missing